The Narcissa D-X Gas Station, on 15050 S. Highway 69 in Ottawa County, Oklahoma, United States, near Miami, Oklahoma, was built in 1934 for the D-X Oil Company. It was listed on the National Register of Historic Places in 2003.

It was located on the last section of U.S. Route 66 in Oklahoma to be paved, in 1937.

When listed it was "the main building in the once thriving village of Narcissa, located south of Miami in Ottawa County on Route 66."

See also 
 Seaba's Filling Station: D-X station on Route 66 in Chandler, Oklahoma

References

Gas stations on the National Register of Historic Places in Oklahoma
National Register of Historic Places in Ottawa County, Oklahoma
Buildings and structures completed in 1934
1934 establishments in Oklahoma
Sunoco LP